This a list of historical coins and banknotes of Poland.

Before the 20th century

20th-century and interwar

Coins 
1924 - See Dziennik Ustaw 1924-045

Post-WWII

1950-currency reform

Series of 1948
The banknotes of the series of 1948 were designed by Polish painter and decorative artist Wacław Borowski. The introduction of these notes was part of the currency reform of 1950, so the banknotes had to be printed quickly and in secrecy; so printing works in Poland (PWPW), Czechoslovakia (STC), Hungary (Pénzjegynyomda), Sweden (Riksbankens Sedeltryckeri), and Canada (British American Bank Note Company Ltd.) were involved.

Series of 1974

See also
 Polish coins and banknotes

References

Currencies of Poland
Economic history of Poland